Justin Donawa (born 27 June 1996) is a Bermudian footballer who plays as a forward for Solihull Moors of  and for the Bermuda national football team. He previously appeared for Somerset Trojans, Black Rock FC and Darlington.

Donawa was a cricket player and triple jumper while growing up in Bermuda, winning three medals in regional competitions and competing at the 2013 World Youth Championships in Athletics. He found success, however, in football, coming to the United States to attend the Berkshire School and then Dartmouth College. Donawa won three Ivy League championships with the Big Green, appeared during school breaks with Somerset Trojans, and spent time in the collegiate offseason with Black Rock FC. He was drafted by Columbus Crew SC in the third round of the 2019 MLS SuperDraft, but was not signed by the club.

Donawa represented Bermuda at U20 level before breaking into the senior national team in 2015. He scored his first two goals for his country on his second cap, coming against the Bahamas in a 2018 World Cup qualifier.

Early life
Born in Sandys Parish, Bermuda, Donawa grew up playing three sports: he ran track and field and played football and cricket during his youth. Donawa took part in the Bermuda Football Association's prep school tour in 2010, earning himself a spot at the Berkshire School in Sheffield, Massachusetts. Competing alongside Jack Harrison and countryman Zeiko Lewis, Donawa was part of a Berkshire team that won NEPSAC Class A state titles in 2012, 2013, and 2014. He was selected to take part in the 2014 High School All-America Game, alongside Harrison and fellow NEPSAC players Francis Atuahene and Edward Opoku.

At club level, Donawa appeared for Black Rock FC during his time at the Berkshire School. He committed to play college soccer for coach Chad Riley and the Dartmouth Big Green.

College and amateur
Donawa debuted for Dartmouth on 3 October 2015, coming off the bench in the Big Green's Ivy League opener against Princeton. He played 48 minutes of a 1–0 Dartmouth victory. Donawa scored his first collegiate goal on 24 October, tallying the game-winning goal in a 2–1 victory over Columbia, and scored his first NCAA tournament goal on 22 November as Dartmouth were eliminated in the second round by Syracuse. Although he appeared in just 10 games, Donawa tallied two goals and three assists and was named Honorable Mention All-Ivy. As a sophomore, Donawa won a regular spot in the Dartmouth lineup, putting up stats of three goals and four assists in 17 appearances. All three of his goals were game-winners: against Seattle on 11 September 2016, New Hampshire on 5 October, and Columbia on 22 October. Dartmouth won their third consecutive Ivy League crown and again advanced to the NCAA tournament, but were eliminated in the second round by Syracuse for the second consecutive season; Donawa was again named Honorable Mention All-Ivy.

As a junior, Donawa tallied three goals and a career and team-high eight assists in 17 appearances. He scored against UMass Lowell on 20 September 2017, the only goal of a 1–0 Dartmouth victory, added a goal and an assist in a 2–1 win over Princeton on 30 September, and scored in a 3–0 win over Hofstra on 3 October, all part of a three-goal, one-assist performance in a four-game span. He was an integral part of a Dartmouth team that claimed their fourth consecutive Ivy League championship, but did not take a kick in the penalty shootout as the Big Green were eliminated from the NCAA tournament by New Hampshire. Donawa was named First Team All-Ivy following the season. As a senior, Donawa missed much of the year due to injury, tallying two goals and an assist in just six appearances. He scored game-winning goals in back-to-back overtime victories, against Massachusetts on 22 September 2018 and Albany on 25 September, but would play his final collegiate game on 2 October against Vermont and miss the remainder of the season due to a sprained ankle. He finished his collegiate career with ten goals from 50 appearances.

Somerset Trojans
Donawa came through the youth setup at Somerset Trojans, playing in the Player Development League and the U-14 KO Cup. He made his senior debut for Somerset on 2 January 2014, appearing off the bench in the Friendship Trophy final as the Trojans claimed a 3–2 victory against Hamilton Parish. He continued to appear for Somerset for four more seasons, albeit infrequently as he could only play for the club while on breaks from school. Donawa returned to Somerset during the 2014–15 season, playing against Robin Hood in the Friendship Trophy and helping the club to claim their first Bermudian Premier Division title in 22 years. He was unable to appear in the title-deciding victory over Southampton Rangers, however, after suffering a sprained ankle while on international duty. Donawa helped the club to another championship in 2015–16, appearing in the Friendship Trophy while on holiday from school. He scored the final goal of a 3–0 victory against Hamilton Parish in the semifinals, giving Somerset the chance to win their eleventh Friendship Trophy after the new year. Against PHC Zebras in the final, Donawa scored the winning goal just before halftime as the Trojans claimed a 2–1 victory. On 12 December 2016, Donawa scored his first career Bermudian Premier League goal. His eighth-minute strike, off an assist from Hubert Buttersfield, helped Somerset claim a 2–2 draw against Devonshire Cougars. His second league goal had to wait until the 2017–18 season, coming in a 3–1 victory over X-Roads Warriors on 11 December 2017. He also added a goal in the semi-finals of the Expansion League Festive Tournament later that month and played the full 90 minutes in a 3–3 draw with North Village Rams on 17 March that clinched Premier Division safety for Somerset. The match against North Village would mark Donawa's final game with the club, as he was unable to participate during the 2018–19 season due to injury and a lack of international clearance.

Black Rock FC
Following his junior season at Dartmouth, Donawa was on the roster of Premier Development League expansion club Black Rock FC. He did not make an appearance as Black Rock qualified for the Eastern Conference semifinals.

Club career

2019 trials
Donawa was not selected to take part in the 2019 MLS Combine after struggling through an injury-ridden senior season at Dartmouth. He went on trial at Scottish Premiership club Aberdeen during December, and although he "definitely got good feedback" was not signed by the club. On 14 January 2019, Columbus Crew SC drafted Donawa with the 66th overall pick in the 2019 MLS SuperDraft. He joined the club for preseason as an unsigned draft pick, but was released midway through camp without earning a contract. Following his release, Donawa went on an unsuccessful trial with USL Championship club Pittsburgh Riverhounds SC. He continued his search for a club following the 2019 CONCACAF Gold Cup, moving to England and going on trial with National League North side Darlington. Donawa impressed manager Alun Armstrong during his trial, tallying a goal in a friendly against Northallerton Town while being described as "a game-changer" and "as good as gold".

Darlington
After impressing during his trial with Darlington, Donawa was offered a deal for the 2019–20 season. He joined fellow Bermudian international Osagi Bascome with the Quakers. Donawa made his debut for Darlington on 3 August 2019 in their 3–1 loss away at Farsley Celtic. He made his first start two weeks later in a 2–0 win at home to Southport, showing his pace on the left wing before being switched to right wing-back after a defensive injury. Donawa's first National League North goal was a late winner in Darlington's first away win of the season, against Alfreton Town. He continued as a regular in matchday squad, apart from when required for international duty, although became frustrated at being used as an impact substitute rather than in the starting eleven. According to the Northern Echo review, Donawa "married electric pace with impressive aerial ability to score nine goals in his debut season", which made him the team's second highest scorer. He signed on for a second season, and added another two goals from five matches before leaving the club in October 2020.

Solihull Moors
On 27 October 2020, Donawa signed for Solihull Moors of the fifth-tier National League. The fee was undisclosed, but was understood by North East Sports News to be £15,000 plus add-ons. He made his debut four days later as a second-half substitute in a 3–1 defeat away to Maidenhead United. On 24 April 2021, he scored a hat-trick in a 5–1 win against Yeovil Town.

International career
Donawa first broke into the Bermudian international setup at the under-20 level, appearing during 2015 CONCACAF U-20 Championship qualifying. He received his first senior call-up for a training camp ahead of the first round of 2018 World Cup qualification and received his first cap in a friendly against Grenada on 6 March 2015. He played 58 minutes of a 2–2 draw before being substituted for Jalen Harvey. Donawa made his competitive debut for the Gombey Warriors on 25 March 2015, starting and scoring his first two international goals in a 5–0 World Cup qualifying victory against the Bahamas. His 57th- and 70th-minute goals were the fourth and fifth strikes of the night for Bermuda. Donawa continued to be called up during his time at Dartmouth, earning eight caps over his four years with the Big Green.

Life outside of football

Personal life
Donawa is the nephew of Roger Trott, who played five List A cricket matches for Bermuda in the 1990s. Donawa's father, Jay, was a distance runner who competed at Auburn in the 1990s; his grandfather, Delwyn Trott, played for the inaugural Devonshire Colts side in the 1950s; and his younger brother Mateo played alongside him for Somerset Trojans. As a youth, Donawa played cricket for the Somerset Cricket Club, competing as a fast bowler. He was called into a training squad for the Bermuda national team in May 2016, but was forced to give up the sport while going to school in the United States.

Track and field career
Donawa began competing in track and field at the age of 14, winning a bronze medal in the boys' under-17 triple jump at the 2011 CARIFTA Games. He returned at the 2012 CARIFTA Games, winning a gold medal in the event with a jump of 14.63 metres. Donawa qualified for the 2012 Central American and Caribbean Junior Championships in Athletics, finishing second in the Male Junior B category. He also competed in the 2013 World Youth Championships in Athletics, placing seventh in the triple jump with a personal best of 15.65 metres.

At Dartmouth, Donawa continued to compete in the triple jump while also beginning to compete in the long jump. He placed second in the triple jump at the 2016 Ivy League Indoor Championship with a jump of 15.57 metres, his collegiate-best mark. In 2017, Donawa took 17th place at the NCAA East Regional during the outdoor season. In his final collegiate meet, the 2018 Ivy League Indoor Championships, Donawa won the Ivy League title with another 15.57 metre jump, making him the first Dartmouth athlete to win a team and individual Ivy League championship in two different sports since Adam Nelson in 1997.

Career statistics

Club

International

International goals
Scores and results list Bermuda's goal tally first.

Honours

Football
Dartmouth
 Ivy League: 2015, 2016, 2017
 Honorable Mention All-Ivy: 2015, 2016
 First Team All-Ivy: 2017

Somerset Trojans
 Bermudian Premier Division: 2014–15
 Friendship Trophy: 2015–16

Black Rock FC
 Northeast Division: 2018

Track and field
Dartmouth
 All-Ivy League (triple jump – indoors): 2016, 2018

References

External links
 Dartmouth profile
 Somerset profile
 Justin Donawa at USL League Two
 
 
 

Living people
1996 births
Bermudian footballers
Male triple jumpers
Male long jumpers
Bermudian cricketers
People from Sandys Parish
Association football forwards
Dartmouth Big Green men's soccer players
Dartmouth Big Green men's track and field athletes
Columbus Crew draft picks
Darlington F.C. players
Solihull Moors F.C. players
National League (English football) players
Bermuda international footballers
2019 CONCACAF Gold Cup players
Bermudian expatriate footballers
Expatriate soccer players in the United States
Bermudian expatriate sportspeople in the United States
Expatriate footballers in England
Bermudian expatriate sportspeople in England
Berkshire School alumni